Alphasphaerolipovirus is a genus of double stranded DNA viruses that infect haloarchaea. The genus contains four species.

Taxonomy
The genus contains the following species:
 Haloarcula hispanica icosahedral virus 2
 Haloarcula hispanica virus PH1
 Haloarcula hispanica virus SH1
 Haloarcula virus HCIV1

Note
The name Halosphaerovirus was also proposed for this genus.

References

Sphaerolipoviridae
Virus genera